Emma Ermawati (born 6 October 1976) is a retired badminton player from Indonesia who specialized in doubles events. She competed at the 2002 Asian Games in Busan, South Korea.

Personal life 
Ermawati husband, Budi Santoso, also a former Indonesian badminton player.

Achievements

World Cup 
Mixed doubles

Asian Championships 
Mixed doubles

Southeast Asian Games 
Women's doubles

Mixed doubles

IBF World Grand Prix 
The World Badminton Grand Prix has been sanctioned by the International Badminton Federation from 1983 to 2006.

Women's doubles

Mixed doubles

 IBF Grand Prix tournament
 IBF Grand Prix Finals tournament

IBF International 
Women's doubles

References

External links 
 

1976 births
Living people
Sportspeople from Bandung
Indonesian female badminton players
Badminton players at the 2002 Asian Games
Asian Games competitors for Indonesia
Competitors at the 1999 Southeast Asian Games
Competitors at the 2001 Southeast Asian Games
Southeast Asian Games gold medalists for Indonesia
Southeast Asian Games silver medalists for Indonesia
Southeast Asian Games bronze medalists for Indonesia
Southeast Asian Games medalists in badminton
20th-century Indonesian women
21st-century Indonesian women